The digit ratio is the ratio of the lengths of different digits or fingers on a hand, the study of which has been considered pseudoscience. The 2D:4D ratio is the most studied digit ratio and is calculated by dividing the length of the index finger of a given hand by the length of the ring finger of the same hand. Although studies have claimed to show a correlation between the 2D:4D digit ratio and various physical and behavioral traits, these studies have drawn criticism for irreproducible or contradictory findings, exaggerated claims of usefulness, and lack of high quality research protocols.

Measurement
The digit length is typically measured on the palmar (ventral, "front", "palm-side") hand, from the midpoint of the bottom crease to the tip of the finger. Measurement of the digits on the dorsal ("back-side") hand, from the tip of the finger to the proximal phalange-bone protrusion (which occurs when digits are bent at 90 degrees to the palm), has recently also gained acceptance. A study has shown that, compared to the palmar digit ratio, the dorsal digit ratio is a better indicator of bone digit ratio. Moreover, differential placing of flexion creases is a factor in the palmar digit ratio.

Other digit ratios are also similarly calculated in the same hand.

It has been suggested that because academics have accepted a variety of techniques and equipment (such as calipers, radiography and photocopy), researchers deliberately record multiple measurements and report only those which have significant findings, a form of reporting bias.

Correlations
The ratio of two digits in particular – the palmar 2nd (index finger) and 4th (ring finger) – is supposedly affected by fetal exposure to hormones, in particular to testosterone, and other androgens; this 2D:4D ratio could therefore be considered a crude measure for prenatal androgen exposure, with lower 2D:4D ratios pointing to higher prenatal androgen exposure. There are also studies that suggest that the palmar 2D:4D ratio is influenced by prenatal estrogen exposure, and that it thus correlates negatively not with prenatal testosterone alone, but rather with the prenatal testosterone-to-estrogen ratio (T:O).

However, subsequent studies have found no relationship between 2D:4D ratios and testosterone or estradiol levels, or even the testosterone to estradiol ratio. Larger studies have also failed to find evidence for 2D:4D being a marker for prenatal androgen exposure. Furthermore, one frequently cited paper on the topic has failed to be replicated.

In keeping with these hormonal differences, the digit ratios are sexually dimorphic, being lower in men than in women. In palmar digit ratios, strong sexual dimorphism occurs in those of digit 2. In dorsal digit ratios, in contrast, strong sexual dimorphism occurs in those of digit 5, with women having shorter fifth digits on average. Overall, the report of sexual dimorphism is much stronger in dorsal digit ratios than in palmar digit ratios, especially as compared to the classic, palmar 2D:4D ratio. Moreover, compared to palmar digit ratio, dorsal digit ratio is a better indicator of bone digit ratio. Thus, while most of the earlier research has focused on palmar 2D:4D ratio, study of other digit ratios is also promising.

Experimental studies of monkeys have shown prenatal testosterone injection produces male-typical changes in dermatoglyphics and in palmar digit length, but not in bone digit length. Moreover, this effect occurs in digit 2 but not in digit 4 in monkeys and frogs. Additionally, human epidermal tissues have only androgen receptors and no estrogen receptors-α. Thus, it is likely that dermatoglyphic tissues in fingers may be more sensitive to prenatal testosterone effect, whereas, as reported above, bone digit ratios may be sensitive to testosterone-to-estrogen ratio. Hence, the palmar 2D:4D ratio reflects a combination of two different hormonal sensitivities. In support of this, a 2019 study has shown that differential placing of flexion creases contributes to sex differences in the palmar 2D:4D ratio.

History of research
That a greater proportion of men have shorter index fingers than ring fingers than do women was noted in the scientific literature several times through the late 1800s, with the statistically significant sex difference in a sample of 201 men and 109 women established by 1930, after which time the sex difference appears to have been largely forgotten or ignored. In 1983, Glenn Wilson of King's College London published a study examining the correlation between assertiveness in women and their digit ratio, which found that women with a lower 2D:4D ratio reported greater assertiveness. This was the first study to examine the correlation between digit ratio and a psychological trait within members of the same sex. Wilson proposed that skeletal structure and personality were simultaneously affected by sex hormone levels in utero. In 1998, John T. Manning and colleagues reported the sex difference in digit ratios was present in two-year-old children and further developed the idea that the index was a marker of prenatal sex hormones. Since then, research on the topic has burgeoned around the world.

Since 2006, 2D:4D digit ratios have been used alongside other methods in an attempt understand Palaeolithic hand stencils found in prehistoric European and Indonesian cave painting.

A 2009 study in Biology Letters argues: "Sexual differences in 2D:4D are mainly caused by the shift along the common allometric line with non-zero intercept, which means 2D:4D necessarily decreases with increasing finger length, and the fact that men have longer fingers than women", which may be the basis for the sex difference in digit ratios and/or any putative hormonal influence on the ratios.

A 2011 paper by Zhengui Zheng and Martin J. Cohn reports "the 2D:4D ratio in mice is controlled by the balance of androgen to estrogen signaling during a narrow window of digit development". The formation of the digits in humans, in utero, is thought to occur by 13 weeks, and the bone-to-bone ratio is consistent from this point into an individual's adulthood. During this period if the fetus is exposed to androgens, the exact level of which is thought to be sexually dimorphic, the growth rate of the 4th digit is increased, as can be seen by analyzing the 2D:4D ratio of opposite sex dizygotic twins, where the female twin is exposed to excess androgens from her brother in utero, and thus has a significantly lower 2D:4D ratio.

Importantly, there has been no correlation between the sex hormone levels of an adult and the individual's 2D:4D, which implies that it is strictly the exposure in utero that causes this phenomenon.

A major problem with the research on this topic comes from the contradiction in the literature as to whether the testosterone level in adults can be predicted by the 2D:4D ratio.

In 2020, a paper by John T Manning and Bernhard Fink reported that at the national level, high mean male 2D:4D was associated with high case fatality rates with COVID-19, and suggested that this may be used to "identify for whom it would be advisable to exercise social distancing." Subsequent researchers failed to replicate their findings, and criticised Manning and Fink for publishing papers that fail under scrutiny despite the urgent need for high quality science during the pandemic that informs medical decisions.

In 2021, a peer reviewed paper by Professor James Smoliga titled "Giving science the finger—is the second-to-fourth digit ratio (2D:4D) a biomarker of good luck? A cross sectional study" heavily criticized the field of research. The researchers followed the same research methodology as other literature and were able to conclude that there is an association of low digit ratio with good luck. This result is attributed to chance, and an illustration of the reproducibility crisis. This is complemented by a satirical list of "pitfalls to avoid in research" which lists high quality research practices that authors hoping to publish false positive findings regarding 2D:4D digit ratios are likely to avoid, which are:

 Pre-registration of study protocol
 Performing or reporting a priori power analysis
 Detailed accounting for multiple comparisons
 Reporting negative findings from other outcomes

Smoliga also provides an algorithm for researchers to identify a correlation between 2D:4D digit ratio, and any outcome measure.

In a response, John T. Manning criticized the researchers for not controlling for ethnicity.

Evidence of androgen effect
The sex difference in 2D:4D is present before birth in humans. The ratio of testosterone to estradiol measured in 33 amniocentesis samples correlated with the child's subsequent 2D:4D ratio. The conclusion of this research supported to an association between low 2D:4D and high levels of testosterone 
compared with estrogen, and high 2D:4D with low 
testosterone relative to estrogen. However, this study has been criticised for its lack of scrutiny despite being frequently cited, and has failed to be replicated.

The level of estrogen in the amniotic fluid is not correlated with higher 2D:4D, as researchers found no difference in estrogen levels between males and females.

Several studies present evidence that digit ratios are heritable.

In a non-clinical sample of women, digit ratio correlated with anogenital distance in the expected direction. In other words, women with a greater anogenital distance, indicating greater prenatal androgen exposure, had a smaller digit ratio.

Disorders of sex development 
Women with congenital adrenal hyperplasia (CAH), which results in elevated androgen levels before birth, have lower, more masculinized 2D:4D on average. Other possible physiological effects include an enlarged clitoris and shallow vagina. Males with CAH have smaller (more masculine) digit ratios than control males, suggesting that prenatal androgens affect digit ratios. Amniocentesis samples show that prenatal levels of testosterone are in the high-normal range in males with CAH, while levels of the weaker androgen androstenedione are several fold higher than in control males. These measures indicate that males with CAH are exposed to greater prenatal concentrations of total androgens than are control males.

A greater digit ratio occurs for men with Klinefelter's syndrome, who have reduced testosterone secretion throughout life compared to control males, than in their fathers or control males.

Digit ratio in men may correlate with genetic variation in the androgen receptor gene. Men with genes that produce androgen receptors that are less sensitive to testosterone (because they have more CAG repeats) have greater, i.e. more feminine, digit ratios. There are reports of a failure to replicate this finding. However, men carrying an androgen receptor with more CAG repeats compensate for the less sensitive receptor by secreting more testosterone, probably as a result of reduced negative feedback on gonadotropins. Thus, it is not clear that 2D:4D would be expected to correlate with CAG repeats, even if it accurately reflects prenatal androgen.

XY individuals with androgen insensitivity syndrome (AIS) due to a dysfunctional gene for the androgen receptor present as women and have feminine digit ratios on average, as would be predicted if androgenic hormones affect digit ratios. This finding also demonstrates that the sex difference in digit ratios is unrelated to the Y chromosome per se.

Explanation of the digit ratio effect
It is not clear why digit ratio might be influenced by prenatal hormones. There is evidence of other similar traits, e.g., otoacoustic emissions and arm-to-trunk length ratio, which show similar effects. Hox genes responsible for both digit and penis development have been implicated in affecting these multiple traits (pleiotropy). Direct effects of sex hormones on bone growth might be responsible, either by regulation of Hox genes in digit development or independently of such genes. Likewise, it is unclear why digit ratio on the right hand should be more responsive than that on the left hand, as is indicated by the greater sex difference on the right than the left. However, because no right–left difference has been found in sexual dimorphism of bone digit ratios (2D:4D) and dorsal digit ratios and because differential placing of flexion creases contributes to sex differences in palmar digit ratio, right–left differences in the placing of flexion creases may be determining right–left difference in palmar 2D:4D ratio.

Geographic and ethnic variation in 2D:4D
Manning and colleagues have shown that 2D:4D ratios vary greatly between different ethnic groups. In a study with Han, Berber, Uygur and Jamaican children as subjects, Manning et al. found that Han children had the highest mean values of 2D:4D (0.954±0.032), they were followed by the Berbers (0.950±0.033), then the Uygurs (0.946±0.037), and the Jamaican children had the lowest mean 2D:4D (0.935±0.035). This variation is far larger than the differences between sexes; in Manning's words, "There's more difference between a Pole and a Finn, than a man and a woman."

The standard deviations associated with each given 2D:4D mean are considerable. For example, the ratio for Han children (0.954±0.032) allows for a ratio as low as 0.922, while the ratio for Jamaican children (0.935±0.035) allows for a ratio as high as 0.970. Thus, some ethnic groups' confidence intervals overlap.

A 2008 study by Lu et al. found that the mean values of 2D:4D of the Hui and the Han in Ningxia were lower than those in European countries like Britain.

In 2007 Manning et al. also found that mean 2D:4D varied across ethnic groups with higher ratios for Whites, Non-Chinese Asians, and Mid-Easterners and lower ratios in Chinese and Black samples.

Two studies explored the question of whether geographical differences in 2D:4D ratios were caused by gene pool differences or whether some environmental variable associated with latitude might be involved (e.g., exposure to sunlight or different day-length patterns). The conclusions were that geographical differences in 2D:4D ratio were caused by genetic pool differences, not by geographical latitude.

Consanguinous parentage (inbreeding) has been found to lower the 2D:4D ratio in offspring, which may account for some of the geographical and ethnic variation in 2D:4D ratios, as consanguinity rates depend on, among others, religion, culture, and geography.

Digit ratio and development 
There is some evidence that 2D:4D ratio may also be indicative for human development and growth. Ronalds et al. (2002) showed that men who had an above average placental weight and a shorter neonatal crown-heel length had higher 2D:4D ratios in adult life. Kumar et al. have reported that a similar effect of hand preference on digit lengths and digit ratios occurs oppositely among children and adults. Moreover, studies about 2D:4D correlations with face shape suggest that testosterone exposure early in life may set some constraints for subsequent development. Prenatal sex steroid ratios (in terms of 2D:4D) and actual chromosomal sex dimorphism were found to operate differently on human faces, but affect male and female face shape by similar patterns. Fink et al. (2004) found that men with low (indicating high testosterone) and women with high (indicating high estrogen) 2D:4D ratios express greater levels of facial symmetry.

Criticism
The digit ratio has received attention within mainstream media because of supposed correlations with health and behavior, however the credibility and usefulness of research into the relationship between digit ratios and traits has been subject to criticism.  Critics have found research to be lacking moderate to strong statistical significance, consistently failing to be replicated, useless as a proxy variable, and have compared the research to pseudoscience.

Although research into digit ratios appears to find statistical significance, there has been criticism of researchers for failing to account for a majority of the variation within a dataset, with one of the most highly publicized papers on the topic failing to account for 96% of variation. Furthermore, skepticism has also been attributed to an abundance of research lacking a cause-and-effect relationship between digit ratio and supposed traits, research that often lacks any theoretical motivation. This criticism was demonstrated in the paper "Giving science the finger—is the second-to-fourth digit ratio (2D:4D) a biomarker of good luck? A cross sectional study" by correlating low 2D:4D digit ratio with good luck, despite following established research methods.

The utilization of digit ratio as a proxy variable has come under scrutiny, as studies that investigate the relationship between a trait and some unobservable variable fail to consider other possible confounding variables. This is especially problematic in cases where the relationship is likely to be weak, such as prenatal testosterone.  Furthermore, critics have pointed out that controlling for confounding variables is an impossible task due to the expanding list of confounding variables, including ethnicity, sex, and physical, medical or behavioral conditions.

Researchers have also pointed out that research into the digit ratio is illustrative of the ongoing replication crisis. Not only have subsequent studies and meta-analysis failed to replicate previous research, but have often found contradictory results, or failed closer scrutiny. Psychologist Martin Voracek has criticized the field for its irreproducible findings, stating it's "like a house of cards built on an unknown and uncertain base" and subsequently compared "the work on finger ratios to phrenology or physiognomy, the discredited ideas that people's head shape or facial features, respectively, reveal their personalities, character, and intelligence."

Other animals
 Dennis McFadden and collaborators have demonstrated sexual dimorphism in hind limb digit ratio in a number of great apes, including gorillas and chimpanzees.
 Emma Nelson and Susanne Shultz are currently investigating how 2D:4D relates to primate mating strategies and the evolution of human sociality.
 Nancy Burley's research group has demonstrated sexual dimorphism in zebra finches, and found a correlation between digit ratio in females and the strength of their preference for sexually selected traits in males.
 Alžbeta Talarovičová and collaborators found in rats that elevated testosterone during the prenatal period can influence 4D length, the 2D:4D ratio, and open field motor activity.
 Peter L. Hurd, Theodore Garland Jr., and their students have examined hindlimb 2D:4D in lines of mice selectively bred for high voluntary wheel-running behavior (see experimental evolution). These high-runner mice exhibit increased 2D:4D. This apparent "feminization" is opposite to the relation seen between 2D:4D and physical fitness in human beings, and is difficult to reconcile with the idea that 2D:4D is a clear proxy for prenatal androgen exposure in mice. The authors suggest that 2D:4D may more accurately reflect effect of glucocorticoids or other factors that regulate any of various genes.
 In pheasants, the ratio of the 2nd to 4th digit of the foot has been shown to be influenced by manipulations of testosterone in the egg.
 Studies in mice indicate that prenatal androgen acts primarily by promoting growth of the fourth digit.

See also 
 Anogenital distance 
 Body mass index
 Chiromancy (palm reading)
 Dermatoglyphics
 Handedness and sexual orientation
 Waist–hip ratio

References

External links 

PubMed listing of papers on digit ratios

Anthropometry
Sex differences in humans
Fingers
Ratios
Testosterone
Pseudoscience